The Fisher FP-202 Koala is a Canadian single-seat high wing, conventional landing gear, single engined light kit aircraft designed for construction by amateur builders. The aircraft was inspired by the design of the Piper J-3 Cub and strongly resembles that design.

Fisher Flying Products was originally based in Edgeley, North Dakota, United States but the company is now located in Dorchester, Ontario, Canada.

Development
The FP-202 was designed by Fisher Aircraft in the United States in 1981 and was intended to meet the requirements of the US FAR 103 Ultralight Vehicles category, including that category's maximum  empty weight. It is also a 51% approved kit for the US homebuilt aircraft category. The design goal was to provide ultralight pilots with an aircraft that looked like and flew like the classic Piper Cub, without the regulation that goes with owning a type certified aircraft. The FP-202 can achieve an empty weight of  when equipped with a lightweight, two-stroke engine, such as the  Rotax 277.

The construction of the FP-202 is unusual for aircraft in its class. The aircraft's structure is entirely made from wood, with the wooden fuselage built from wood strips arranged in a geodesic form, resulting in a very strong and light aircraft with redundant load paths. Like the Cub, both the wings and fuselage on the Koala are covered with doped aircraft fabric. The wings are strut-braced and utilize jury struts. The landing gear is bungee suspended and the tail wheel is steerable. Brakes are optional. The company claims it would take an average amateur builder 250–500 hours to build the FP-202.

Specifications (FP-202 Koala)

See also

References

External links

1980s Canadian ultralight aircraft
Aircraft first flown in 1981
High-wing aircraft
Single-engined tractor aircraft